Parliamentary elections were held in Nicaragua in November 1918 for half of the Deputies and a third of the Senators of the National Congress.

References

Elections in Nicaragua
Nicaragua
1918 in Nicaragua
November 1918 events
Election and referendum articles with incomplete results